Matthew Levitt is the Fromer-Wexler Fellow and director of the Jeanette and Eli Reinhard Program on Counterterrorism and Intelligence at the Washington Institute for Near East Policy and an adjunct professor in Georgetown University's Center for Security Studies (CSS). From 2005 to early 2007 he was a deputy assistant secretary for intelligence and analysis at the U.S. Department of the Treasury. In that capacity, he served both as a senior official within the department's terrorism and financial intelligence branch and as deputy chief of the Office of Intelligence and Analysis. From 2001 to 2005, Levitt served the Institute as founding director of its Terrorism Research Program (now renamed as above), which was established in the wake of the September 11 attacks. Previously, he provided tactical and strategic analytical support for counter-terrorism operations at the FBI, focusing on fundraising and logistical support networks for Middle Eastern terrorist groups. During his FBI service, Levitt participated as a team member in a number of crisis situations, including the terrorist threat surrounding the turn of the millennium and the September 11 attacks.

Levitt has also lectured on international terrorism on behalf of the Departments of State, Justice, Defense, and Homeland Security, consulted for various U.S. government agencies and private industry, and testified before the Senate and House on matters relating to international terrorism. He is a term member of the Council on Foreign Relations, a member of the international advisory board for both the Institute for Counter-terrorism in Israel and the International Centre for Political Violence & Terrorism Research in Singapore, and a CTC fellow with the Combating Terrorism Center (CTC) at the U.S. Military Academy (West Point). He serves on the advisory board of Foundation for Defense of Democracies' Center on Sanctions and Illicit Finance (CSIF) and formerly served on the academic advisory board for the Emirati Center for Strategic Studies and Research (ECSSR). Levitt was a graduate research fellow at Harvard Law School's Program on Negotiation and previously taught at Johns Hopkins University's Paul H. Nitze School of Advanced International Studies (SAIS) and Zanvyl Krieger School of Arts and Sciences.

Levitt received his B.A. from  Yeshiva University and his M.A. and Ph.D. from The Fletcher School of Law and Diplomacy at Tufts University. He attended high school at the Maimonides School.

Levitt has written extensively on terrorism, countering violent extremism, illicit finance and sanctions, the Middle East, and Arab-Israeli peace negotiations, with articles appearing in peer-reviewed journals, policy magazines, and the press, including the Wall Street Journal, Washington Post, Foreign Affairs, Foreign Policy, and numerous other publications. He is also a frequent guest on the national and international media, and the author of several books and monographs, including Hamas: Politics, Charity and Terrorism in the Service of Jihad (Yale University Press, 2006), Negotiating Under Fire: Preserving Peace Talks in the Face of Terror Attacks (Rowman & Littlefield, 2008), and Hezbollah: The Global Footprint of Lebanon's Party of God (Georgetown University Press, 2013), as well as creator of the Lebanese Hezbollah Select Worldwide Activity Interactive Map and Timeline.

Levitt was a key prosecution witness in the 2007 trial of the Palestinian-American charity, the Holy Land Foundation.

Published works
 Hezbollah: The Global Footprint of Lebanon's Party of God (Georgetown University Press, 2013)
 Hamas: Politics, Charity, and Terrorism in the Service of Jihad (Yale University Press, 2006)
 Targeting Terror: U.S. Policy toward Middle Eastern State Sponsors and Terrorist Organizations, Post-September 11 (Washington Institute for Near East Policy, 2002)
 Negotiating Under Fire: Preserving Peace Talks in the Face of Terror Attacks (Lanham: Rowman & Littlefield, 2008)
 "Hezbollah Finances: Funding the Party of God," in Terrorism Financing and State Responses: A Comparative Perspective (Stanford University Press, 2007)
 "Hamas Social Welfare: In the Service of Terror," in The Making of a Terrorist: Recruitment, Training, and Root Causes (New York: Praeger Publishers, 2005)
 "The Impact of Acute Security Crises on the Process of Ongoing Negotiations: Lessons from the Palestinian-Israeli Peace Process, 1993-1996" (Ph.D. dissertation, Fletcher School of Law and Diplomacy, Tufts University, 2005).

References

External links

Year of birth missing (living people)
Living people
Middle Eastern studies in the United States
Counterterrorism theorists
Yeshiva University alumni
The Fletcher School at Tufts University alumni
Harvard Law School fellows
Johns Hopkins University faculty
Maimonides School alumni
Experts on terrorism